Nicholas D'Agostino (born 25 February 1998) is an Australian professional soccer player who plays as a striker for Viking FK.

Early life
D'Agostino was born on the Gold Coast into a family of Italian and Maltese descent. He began playing junior football for the Musgrave Mustangs at the Under 7s level before switching to play for Runaway Bay in the local Gold Coast Football competitions. D'Agostino attended The Southport School throughout his upbringing.

Club career

Brisbane Roar
D'Agostino signed a two-year contract with Brisbane Roar on 5 August 2016.

Perth Glory
In June 2019, following new coach Robbie Fowler's changes in squads, D'Agostino left Brisbane Roar and joined Perth Glory.
On 7 August 2019, D’Agostino made his competitive debut for Perth Glory, in a FFA Cup fixture against Western Sydney Wanderers.

Melbourne Victory
D'Agostino joined Melbourne Victory in August 2021. He signed a three-year contract, reuniting him with his former manager Tony Popovic.

Viking FK
In January 2023, D'Agostino transferred to Norwegian club Viking for an undisclosed fee. He signed a four-year contract with the club.

International career
He's eligible to represent Australia, Malta and Italy due to his origins. In 2019, the Maltese FA were keen on verifying D'Agostino's eligibility to represent Malta at first team level, due to having Maltese grandparents.

He was selected by Graham Arnold for the under-23 team in the 2020 AFC U-23 Championship qualifiers which took place in Cambodia. After being goalless in his first two matches, he scored a double in the final group match against South Korea to help Australia advance through to the finals which is going to be held in Thailand.

In the main tournament, D'Agostino became the hero for Australia, having scored only three goals, but mostly important one which guaranteed his team a victory over Thailand at the group stage, and especially, the only goal against Uzbekistan in the third-place encounter which clinched Australia a place for the 2020 Summer Olympics.

The Olyroos beat Argentina in their first group match but were unable to win another match. They were therefore not in medal contention.

He was called up to the senior Australia squad for the 2022 FIFA World Cup qualifiers on 24 and 29 March 2022.

Career statistics

Honours
Melbourne Victory
FFA Cup: 2021

Individual
 PFA A-League Team of the Season: 2021–22

References

External links
 

Living people
1998 births
Sportspeople from the Gold Coast, Queensland
Soccer players from Queensland
Sportsmen from Queensland
Association football forwards
Australian soccer players
Australia international soccer players
Brisbane Roar FC players
Perth Glory FC players
Melbourne Victory FC players
Viking FK players
A-League Men players
National Premier Leagues players
Australian people of Italian descent
Sportspeople of Italian descent
Australian people of Maltese descent
Footballers at the 2020 Summer Olympics
Olympic soccer players of Australia
Australian expatriate soccer players
Expatriate footballers in Norway
Australian expatriate sportspeople in Norway